Wang Chongsheng (born 22 September 1966) is a Chinese gymnast. He competed in eight events at the 1988 Summer Olympics.

References

1966 births
Living people
Chinese male artistic gymnasts
Olympic gymnasts of China
Gymnasts at the 1988 Summer Olympics
Place of birth missing (living people)
Asian Games medalists in gymnastics
Gymnasts at the 1986 Asian Games
Asian Games gold medalists for China
Medalists at the 1986 Asian Games
20th-century Chinese people